Black Limelight is a 1959 Australian TV play. It was shot in ABC's Melbourne studios. It was made at a time when Australian drama production was rare.

Premise
A married man, Peter, is suspected of murdering his mistress. His wife Mary fights to clear his name. She discovers his lawyer friend is the killer.

Cast
Patricia Kennedy as Mary	
Bruce Beeby as Peter
Diana Bell		
Moira Carleton		
Frank Gatliff as lawyer friend		
Ken Goodlet		
Laurie Lange		
Joy Mitchell		
Beverley Phillips as the girlfriend	
Nevil Thurgood

Production
A bathing scene was shot at Canadian Bay.  It also included scenes shot in North Balwyn.

Patricia Kennedy had a five-minute monologue which was reportedly to be the longest speech up to that moment on Melbourne TV drama.

Reception
The TV critic from The Sydney Morning Herald thought that "Patricia Kennedy's remarkable dramatic strength in the big leading role did much to minimise the gimmicky construction of thriller plot and some lack of incisive editing" and that "William Sterling's production was, in most places, worthy of the material."

The critic from The Age said "there wasn't a great deal to enthuse about... Channel 2 can and will do more significant dramas."

References

External links

Australian drama television films
1959 television plays
Australian crime drama films
Films directed by William Sterling (director)